High Worsall is a hamlet and civil parish in the Hambleton District of North Yorkshire, England. The population of the parish was estimated at 40 in 2010. The population remained at less than 100 at the 2011 Census. Details are included in the civil parish of Low Worsall.

The area contains evidence of a deserted medieval village, featured on Time Team Series 5  Episode 8, March 1998.

High Worsall was the highest tidal point on the River Tees until the building of the Tees Barrage.

References 

Villages in North Yorkshire
Civil parishes in North Yorkshire
Deserted medieval villages in North Yorkshire